BHMS is a four letter acronym that can stand for
 Bachelor of Homeopathic Medicine and Surgery
Bachelor of Homeopathic Medicine and Surgery is an undergraduate course for studying Homeopathy in India . It is an entry level course for becoming Homeopathic Doctor in India . BHMS is governed by Ministry of Ayush in India . Where “AYUSH “ stands for 

AY. Ayurveda  

U.  Unnani
 
S.  Siddha 
 
H.  Homeopathy . 

There are many Homeopathic Medical Colleges in India Approved by Ministry of Ayush . 

Some of the top Homeopathic Medical Colleges for Doing BHMS in India are:

1.  National Institute of Homeopathy .

2.  Lal Bahadur Shastri Government Homeopathic Medical College Phaphamau, Prayagraj.

3.  Homeopathic Medical College Abohar .

4.  Bhopal Institute of Homeopathy 

5.  Bhartiya Vidhyapeeth Homeopathic Medical College .

6.  Nehru Homeopathic Medical College .

Schools
 Business and Hotel Management School - Switzerland
 Bret Harte Middle School (San Jose, California)
 Bret Harte Middle School (Oakland, California)
 Brandywine Heights Middle School (Topton, Pennsylvania)
 Black Hawk Middle School in Eagan, Minnesota